Como novio de pueblo is a 2019 Mexican comedy film directed by Joe Rendón. The film premiered on 15 March 2019, starred by José María de Tavira opposite Regina Blandón, with  Martín Altomaro, and Ricardo Polanco in supporting roles . The plot revolves around Diego, who after being stood up on his wedding day is shattered and goes from living the best day of his life to having the worst moment of his existence. His cousins do not allow Diego to fall and take him to the beach to forget and have fun. it's an adaptation of the Spanish film Cousinhood by Daniel Sánchez Arévalo.

Cast 
 José María de Tavira as Diego
 Regina Blandón as Martina
 Ricardo Polanco as Miguel
 Martín Altomaro as Julián
 Damayanti Quintanar as Yolanda
 Marianna Burelli as Toña
 Emiliano Saiz y Madrid as Dani
 Víctor Huggo Martin as Bachi
 Alicia Jaziz as Clara
 Daniel Tovar as Andrés Barragán

References

External links 
 

Mexican comedy films
2019 comedy films
2019 films
2010s Mexican films
2010s Spanish-language films